Leslie Katz  is a former Solicitor General for New South Wales (1997–1998) who later became a judge of the Federal Court of Australia. Katz served on the Court from 30 September 1998 to 21 March 2002. Katz became seriously ill in December 2001, prompting his resignation the following year. Previously an academic at the University of Sydney, Katz in 1980 had become a member of the New South Wales Bar.

As Solicitor General, Katz appeared in a case arising out of the Hindmarsh Island bridge controversy, where it was argued removing heritage protection is unconstitutional.

References 

Living people
Solicitors General for New South Wales
Year of birth missing (living people)